She Waits is a 1972 American television horror film directed by Delbert Mann and starring Patty Duke, David McCallum, and Dorothy McGuire. It follows a murdered woman whose spirit possesses her husband's new wife.

Cast
Patty Duke as Laura Wilson
David McCallum as Mark Wilson
Dorothy McGuire as Sarah Wilson
Lew Ayres as Dr. Sam Carpenter
Beulah Bondi as Mrs. Medina
James T. Callahan as David Brody  
Nelson Olmsted as Antique Dealer Kurawicz

Reception
Author and critic John Kenneth Muir wrote:A story of spirit possession, She Waits (1972) is one of the most long-winded and dull of the early 1970’s made-for-TV horror films. Basically, the movie sets down in the Wilson family house, and rarely leaves that setting.  Although it is possible that a feeling of claustrophobia was what director Delbert Mann and writer Art Wallace were seeking here, the result is nonetheless disappointing. At 74 minutes, She Waits feel practically endless...<p>Basically, She Waits features no real action, no real explanation for the survival of Elaine’s spirit in the house, and no real horror, either. Despite a fine, competent cast that includes McCallum and Duke, the characters here are exceptionally dull-witted, failing to put two-and-two together for a long time.

References

External links

1972 films
1972 horror films
1972 television films
American horror television films
American supernatural horror films
Films directed by Delbert Mann
1970s American films